A ship canal is a canal especially intended to accommodate ships used on the oceans, seas, or lakes to which it is connected.{{sfn|Johnson's|1883|p=1660}}

 Definition 

Ship canals can be distinguished from barge canals, which are intended to carry barges and other vessels specifically designed for river and/or canal navigation. Ships capable of navigating large bodies of open water typically have more draft, and are higher above the water than vessels for inland navigation. A ship canal therefore typically offers deeper water and higher bridge clearances than a barge canal suitable for vessels of similar length and width constraints.

Ship canals may be specially constructed from the start to accommodate ships, or less frequently they may be enlarged barge canals or canalized  or channelized rivers. There are no specific minimum dimensions for ship canals, with the size being largely dictated by the size of ships in use nearby at the time of construction or enlargement.

Ship canals may be constructed for a number of reasons, including:

 To create a shortcut and avoid lengthy detours.
 To create a navigable shipping link between two land-locked seas or lakes.
 To provide inland cities with a direct shipping link to the sea.
 To provide an economical alternative to other options.

 History 
Early canals were connected with natural rivers, either as short extensions or improvements to them.

One of the first canals built was the Grand Canal of China, which was developed over a long period starting in the 5th century BCE. In the modern era, canals in the United Kingdom are typically associated with the Duke of Bridgewater, who hired the engineer James Brindley and had the first canal (the Bridgewater Canal) built that ran over a flowing river.

In the United States, the canal that brought about an age of canal building was the Erie Canal. It was a long-sought-after canal and connected the Great Lakes to the Hudson River. This canal initiated a half-century-long boom of canal building and brought about many new features that allowed canals to be used in different areas previously inaccessible to canals. These features include locks, which allow a ship to move between different altitudes, and puddling, which waterproofed the canal.

 Notable ship canals 

 Navigability 
The standard used in the European Union for classifying the navigability of inland waterways is the European Agreement on Main Inland Waterways of International Importance (AGN)'' of 1996, adopted by The Inland Transport Committee of the United Nations Economic Commission for Europe (ECE), which defines the following classes:

See also 

 Glossary of nautical terms (A-L)
 Glossary of nautical terms (M-Z)
 Great Lakes Waterway
 Lake freighter
 Merchant vessel
 Navigability
 Ship transport
 Watercraft
 Waterway

References

Notes

External links 
 

Coastal construction
 
Canal
Water transport
Canals